Eduard Nikolayevich Uspensky (22 December 193714 August 2018) was a Soviet and Russian children's writer and poet, author of over 70 books, as well as a playwright, screenwriter and TV presenter. His works have been translated into 25 languages and spawned around 60 cartoon adaptations. Among the characters he created are Cheburashka and Gena the Crocodile, Uncle Fyodor and Kolobki brothers. He was awarded Order "For Merit to the Fatherland", 4th class in 1997.

Biography
Uspensky was born in Yegoryevsk, in Moscow Oblast into a Russian family. His father Nikolai Mikhailovich Uspensky came from the city of Yelets and was a distant relative of Tikhon Khrennikov. He served as a high-ranking official in the Central Committee of the Communist Party of the Soviet Union. Eduard's mother Natalia Alekseyevna Uspenskaya (nee Dzurova) was an engineering technologist from Vyshny Volochyok. She came from a merchantry social estate. Her paternal ancestors were Poles who were resettled in Russia after one of the Polish uprisings.

In 1941 with the start of the war the family was evacuated to Siberia where they spent two years. They returned to Moscow later on. After graduating as an engineer, Uspensky earned his living by writing and producing animations.

Besides writing and producing, Uspensky has enjoyed a professional role as a long-lasting figure in radio and television. He was among the founders of the longest-running Russian children's TV show Good Night, Little Ones! and the popular radio program Radio Nanny produced with the aim of featuring songs and humorous dialogue as integral elements of an educational radio program explaining concepts in grammar, mathematics, scientific subjects, and courteous behavior to children.

From 1991 to 2016 he hosted the musical TV and radio talk show Ships Used to Enter Our Harbour where he and his guests recollected the so-called street folklore, which included Russian chanson and blatnaya pesnya. The songs were performed by both professional and amateur singers, politicians, actors and people of various occupations.

In addition to children's books, Uspensky's creative output also includes plays and poems.

Death 
Uspensky died of cancer on 14 August 2018 in his country house (Puchkovo village, part of Moscow's Troitsky Administrative Okrug). He was buried at the Troyekurovskoye Cemetery, plot 21.

Uspensky's work in literature
Uspensky's first book about Uncle Fyodor, Uncle Fedya, His Dog, and His Cat, was first published in Russian in 1974. The main character is a six-year-old boy who is referred to as 'Uncle Fyodor' because he appears serious-minded, self-reliant and responsible. After his parents don't let him keep Matroskin, a talking cat, Uncle Fyodor leaves his home. With the dog Sharik, the three set up a home in the country, a village called Prostokvashino (Простоквашино, from the Russian for buttermilk, простоквашa). After finding a treasure, Uncle Fyodor can afford to buy a tractor that runs on soup and potatoes, and a portable sun to do the heating during the winter. The book was made into a successful animated film, Three from Prostokvashino (and its two sequels). Uspensky continued with Uncle Fyodor in other books, which have not, however, been as successful. Uspensky published other books with human-like animal characters.

Selected books
Crocodile Gene and His Friends (1966)
Uncle Fedya, His Dog, and His Cat (1974) on archive.org
The Little Warranty People (1975)

Selected screenplays
 Gena the Crocodile (1969)
 Happy Merry-Go-Round № 1 (1969), № 3 (1971), № 19 (1988)
 Cheburashka (1971)
 Shapoklyak (1974)
 Three from Prostokvashino (1978)
 Uncle AU (1979)
 Holidays in Prostokvashino (1980)
 Plasticine Crow (1981)
 Along Unknown Paths (1982)
 Cheburashka Goes to School (1983)
 Winter in Prostokvashino (1984)
 About Vera and Anfisa (1986)
 Investigation Held by Kolobki (1986–1987)
 The Fixies (2010)
 Cheburashka (2013)

References

External links

 

1937 births
2018 deaths
20th-century Russian male writers
20th-century Russian screenwriters
21st-century Russian male writers
21st-century Russian screenwriters
People from Yegoryevsk
Moscow Aviation Institute alumni
Recipients of the Order "For Merit to the Fatherland", 4th class
Male screenwriters
Russian children's writers
Russian male dramatists and playwrights
Russian male poets
Russian male writers
Russian people of Polish descent
Russian radio personalities
Russian television presenters
Soviet children's writers
Soviet dramatists and playwrights
Soviet male poets
Soviet screenwriters
Deaths from cancer in Russia
Deaths from prostate cancer
Burials in Troyekurovskoye Cemetery